Apple Pie Hill is a hill in Tabernacle Township, Burlington County, New Jersey. A  fire tower stands atop the summit, offering views of the surrounding Pine Barrens. The skylines of Atlantic City and Philadelphia are visible from the top of the tower. It lies along the Batona Trail in Wharton State Forest, making it a popular hiking destination. 

On September 10, 2016, due to vandalism, the Department of Environmental Protection closed Apple Pie Hill to public access by erecting a fence around the tower. However, the tower is open to visitors when staff members are present and by appointment.

Soils are sandy almost everywhere, with profiles that resemble classic podzol development; Atsion, Lakehurst, Lakewood, and Woodmansie are common soil series.

References

Mountains of New Jersey
Landforms of Burlington County, New Jersey
Tabernacle Township, New Jersey
Landforms of the Pine Barrens (New Jersey)